Jerusalem is a city in the Middle East.

Jerusalem or Jeruzalem may also refer to:

Places

Middle East
 Jerusalem District, State of Israel
 Jerusalem Governorate, Palestinian National Authority
 Mutasarrifate of Jerusalem, an Ottoman District from 1872 to 1917
 Kingdom of Jerusalem, a Christian kingdom from 1099 to 1291

United States
 Jerusalem, Arkansas, unincorporated community in Conway County
Jerusalem, Baltimore County, Maryland, unincorporated community
 Jerusalem Mill Village, living history museum in Maryland
 Jerusalem, Michigan, an unincorporated community
 Jerusalem, New York, town in Yates County
 Jerusalem, Ohio, village in Monroe County
 Jerusalem, Rhode Island, an unincorporated village in the incorporated town of Narragansett in Washington County
 Jerusalem, Virginia, former name of Courtland, a town in Southampton County
 Jerusalem and Figtree Hill, U.S. Virgin Islands

New Zealand
 Jerusalem, New Zealand, also known as Hiruharama, a village in the Manawatu-Whanganui Region
 Hiruharama, a transliteration of "Jerusalem", a village in the Gisborne District

Other places
 Jerusalem of Lithuania, a nickname for Vilnius, Lithuania
 Jerusalem, Lincolnshire, a village in England
 Jeruzalem, Ljutomer, a village in Slovenia
 Jeruzalem, Pomeranian Voivodeship, a village in Poland
 Jerusalem (Königsberg), a former quarter of Königsberg, Prussia
 Jerusalem, a village and administrative part of Příbram, Czech Republic
 Góra Kalwaria, a town in Poland formerly known as Nowa Jerozolima ("New Jerusalem")
 Yerusalimka or Ierusalimka, a Jewish quarter of the town of Vinnytsia
  Nowa Jerozolima, an 18th century village, now part of Warsaw
Jeruzalem, a restaurant in Delft, Netherlands

Arts

Literature
 Jerusalem Delivered, a 1581 epic poem by Torquato Tasso
 "Jerusalem" (poem), common name for the 1804 poem "And did those feet in ancient time" by William Blake
 Jerusalem The Emanation of the Giant Albion, an illuminated book created from 1804 to 1820 by William Blake
 Jerusalem (Mendelssohn), philosophical book published in 1783
 Jerusalem (Lagerlöf novel), 1901 novel by Selma Lagerlöf
 Jerusalem, 1996 novel by Cecelia Holland 
 Jerusalem, 2009 novel by Patrick Neate
 Jerusalem: The Biography, 2011 historical book by Simon Sebag Montefiore
 Jerusalem (Moore novel), a 2016 novel by Alan Moore
 O Jerusalem!, an epic history of the city.

Music
 Jerusalem-Yerushalayim, 2008 oratorio-musical by Antony Pitts
 Jerusalem (British band), early 1970s
 Jerusalem (Swedish band), founded in 1975 
 Jérusalem, 1847 opera by Giuseppe Verdi

Albums
 Jerusalem (Jerusalem album), by the Swedish band Jerusalem, 1978
 Jerusalem (Sleep album), title of an unauthorized 1999 release of Sleep's third album, also released as Dopesmoker
 Jerusalem (Steve Earle album), 2002
 Jerusalem, by Alpha Blondy featuring The Wailers, 1986
 Jerusalem (EP), by Mark Stewart

Songs

 "Jerusalem" (hymn), a setting to music of Blake's poem And did those feet in ancient time, written by Sir Hubert Parry in 1916 and used as a hymn 
 "Jerusalem", 1973 song from the album Brain Salad Surgery by Emerson, Lake & Palmer
 "Jerusalem", 1981 track on Chariots of Fire by Ambrosian Singers and Vangelis
 "Jerusalem", 1988 track on I Am Kurious Oranj by The Fall
 "Blake's Jerusalem", 1990 song on the album The Internationale by Billy Bragg
 "Jerusalem", a song from The Chemical Wedding by Bruce Dickinson
 "Jerusalem of Gold", Israeli patriotic song written in 1967
 "Jerusalem", 1970 instrumental by Herb Alpert from Summertime
 "Jerusalem", 1971 song on Long Player by The Faces
 "The Holy City" (song), a religious Victorian ballad dating from 1892, sometimes known as "Jerusalem" because of the prominence of that word in the refrain
 "With a Shout (Jerusalem)", 1981 song by U2 from October
 "Jerusalem"  (Belouis Some song), from his 1985 album Some People 
 "Jerusalem"  (Alphaville song), from their 1986 album Afternoons in Utopia 
 "Jerusalem", title song from the 1986 album by Alpha Blondy featuring The Wailers
 "Jerusalem", 1987 song by Sinéad O'Connor from The Lion and the Cobra
 "Jerusalem" (Dan Bern song), 1996 work from Dog Boy Van by Dan Bern
 "Jerusalem", 2004 song by Dutch singer Anouk on Hotel New York
 "Jerusalem" (Out of Darkness Comes Light), 2006 work by Hasidic reggae musician Matisyahu
 "Jerusalem", 2007 song by Stanley Clarke from The Toys of Men
 "Jerusalem", 2010 song by Rosamund Pike, Tom Wilkinson, Stephen Merchant, Sanjeev Bhaskar, Pam Ferris and cast from Jackboots on Whitehall

Other arts
 Jerusalem (1996 film), 1996 Swedish film, directed by Bille August, based on Selma Lagerlöf's 1901 novel
 Jerusalem (2013 film), a National Geographic documentary narrated by Benedict Cumberbatch
 Jerusalem (painting), an 1867 painting by Jean-Léon Gérôme
 Jerusalem (play), 2009 work created by Jez Butterworth
 JeruZalem, 2015 Israeli film directed by Doron Paz and Yoav Paz

Other uses
 Jerusalem (surname), a surname (and a list of people with the name)
 Jerusalem artichoke, a vegetable
 Jerusalem (computer virus)
 Jerusalem College of Engineering, Chennai, an engineering college in Tamil Nadu, India
 Jerusalem! Tactical Game of the 1948 War, a 1975 board wargame that simulates the 1948 Arab-Israeli War
 Jerusalem: The Three Roads to the Holy Land, 2002 historical adventure video game
 Spider Jerusalem, fictional character in the comic Transmetropolitan
 Council of Jerusalem, early Christian council held around the year 50
 A metonym for the Israeli Government

See also
 Aleje Jerozolimskie (literally Jerusalem Avenues), a street in Warsaw, Poland
 East Jerusalem
 West Jerusalem
 Eyerusalem, given name